Carbonear-Trinity-Bay de Verde is a provincial electoral district of the House of Assembly of Newfoundland and Labrador, Canada. The district covers the eastern edge of Trinity Bay and the tip of Conception Bay. As of 2011, there are 6,968 eligible voters living within the district.

The district includes the communities of: Bay de Verde, Cavendish, Carbonear, Grate's Cove, Green's Harbour, Hants Harbour, Heart's Content, Heart's Delight, Heart's Desire, Hopeall, Islington, Long Beach, Lower Island Cove, New Perlican, Northern Bay, Old Perlican, Perry's Cove, Red Head Cove, Salmon Cove, Spout Cove, Western Bay and Winterton. In the 2007 redistribution, added a small chunk of Carbonear-Harbour Grace while losing 16 per cent of the district to Bellevue. The district was subject to redistribution in 2015.

Members of the House of Assembly
The district has elected the following Members of the House of Assembly:

As Bay de Verde/Carbonear-Bay de Verde

Election results

Carbonear-Trinity-Bay de Verde

Trinity-Bay de Verde

|-

|-

|-
 
|NDP
|Sheina Lerman
|align="right"|659
|align="right"|14.16
|align="right"|+9.02
|}

|-

|-

|-
 
|NDP
|Don Penney
|align="right"|257
|align="right"|5.18
|align="right"|+0.75
|}

|-

|-

|-
 
|NDP
|Victoria Harnum
|align="right"|287
|align="right"|4.43
|align="right"|
|}

|-

|-

|-
 
|NDP
|Jeff Jacobs
|align="right"|320
|align="right"|5.4
|align="right"|
 
|NLP
|Monty Newhook
|align="right"|214
|align="right"|3.6
|align="right"|
|}

 
|NDP
|Bill Hiscock
|align="right"|353
|align="right"|
|align="right"|
|-
|}

 
|NDP
|Lucy Tuck
|align="right"|305
|align="right"|
|align="right"|

|Independent
|Peter George Hiscock
|align="right"|257
|align="right"|
|align="right"|
|-
|}

 
|NDP
|Bert Pitcher
|align="right"|189
|align="right"|
|align="right"|

|Independent
|Bren Howard
|align="right"|84
|align="right"|
|align="right"|
|-
|}

 
|NDP
|Bert Pitcher
|align="right"|685
|align="right"|
|align="right"|
|-
|}

|-
|}

References

External links
 Website of the Newfoundland and Labrador House of Assembly

Newfoundland and Labrador provincial electoral districts